Grdina is a largely dispersed settlement in the Haloze Hills in the Municipality of Majšperk  in northeastern Slovenia. There is a small core to the settlement at the confluence of Gabrščica and Skralška creeks. The area is part of the traditional region of Styria. It is now included with the rest of the municipality in the Drava Statistical Region.

References

External links
Grdina at Geopedia

Populated places in the Municipality of Majšperk